Central Films is a Paris-based  French motion picture production company, founded in 2004, by Fernando Sulichin.

Mary
Its first feature film was Mary by Abel Ferrara, starring Juliette Binoche, Forest Whitaker, Matthew Modine and Heather Graham.

The film premiered at the 62nd Venice International Film Festival, and received Jury Special Prize.

Babel
It was followed by Babel directed by Alejandro González Iñárritu, and co-produced with Fernando Sulichin's longtime partner Jon Kilik.

Winner of the Best Director Award at the 2006 Cannes Film Festival, Babel is the final entry of a trilogy started by Iñárritu with Amores Perros and 21 Grams.

I Come With The Rain
Consistent with a big authors outline, Central Films released I Come with the Rain by Tran Anh Hung, starring Josh Hartnett and Elias Koteas, in 2009.

Selected filmography
2009 : I Come with the Rain
2006 : Babel
2005 : Mary
2005 : There Is No Direction (documentary)

External links
 Official Site

Film production companies of France
Mass media companies established in 2004
Mass media in Paris